Beverley Felicity Badenhorst is South African politician serving as a Member of the Gauteng Provincial Legislature since May 2019. Badenhorst is a member of the Economic Freedom Fighters.

Political career
Badenhorst is a member of the Economic Freedom Fighters. After the 2019 provincial election, she was nominated for the Gauteng Provincial Legislature. She took office on 22 May 2019.

Badenhorst was given her committee assignments on 13 June 2019. She serves as an alternate member of the Standing Committee on Public Accounts and as a member of the  Social Development Portfolio Committee.

References

Living people
Year of birth missing (living people)
Members of the Gauteng Provincial Legislature
Economic Freedom Fighters politicians
21st-century South African politicians
21st-century South African women politicians
Women members of provincial legislatures of South Africa